Maamoun is an Arabic surname. Notable people with the surname include:

Karim Maamoun (born 1979), Egyptian tennis player
Karim-Mohamed Maamoun (born 1991), Egyptian tennis player
Maha Maamoun (born 1972), Egyptian artist and curator

Arabic-language surnames